Syria competed at the 2016 Summer Olympics in Rio de Janeiro, Brazil, from 5 to 21 August 2016. It was the nation's thirteenth appearance at the Summer Olympics since its debut in 1948.

Syrian Olympic Committee sent a team of seven athletes, four men and three women, to compete in five different sports at the Games, matching the nation's roster size with Beijing 2008 and Atlanta 1996. This was also the youngest delegation in Syria's Olympic history, with about half the team under the age of 25, and many of them were expected to reach their peak in time for the 2020 Summer Olympics in Tokyo. Among the sports represented by the athletes, Syria made its Olympic debut in table tennis, as well as its return to judo after a twelve-year absence.

The Syrian delegation featured four returning Olympians from the previous Games; among them were hurdler Ghfran Almouhamad and swimmers Bayan Jumah (women's 50 m freestyle) and American-based breaststroker Azad Al-Barazi. Attending his third Olympics as the oldest and most experienced competitor (aged 29), high jumper Majed Aldin Ghazal reprised his role of leading the Syrian team as the nation's flag bearer for the second consecutive time in the opening ceremony.

Syria, however, did not win any Olympic medals in Rio de Janeiro. The nation's last medal happened at the 2004 Summer Olympics in Athens, where heavyweight boxer Naser Al-Shami bagged the silver. Unable to end the podium drought in twelve years, Ghazal improved upon his twenty-eighth position from London 2012 to produce a more substantial finish for the Syrians, sharing a seventh-place tie with Cyprus' Kyriakos Ioannou and the Bahamas' Donald Thomas in the men's high jump final.

Athletics
 
Syrian athletes have so far achieved qualifying standards in the following athletics events (up to a maximum of 3 athletes in each event):

Track & road events

Field events

Judo
 
Syria has received an invitation from the Tripartite Commission to send a judoka competing in the men's lightweight category (73 kg) to the Olympics, signifying the nation's Olympic return to the sport for the first time since 2004.

Swimming

Syria has received a Universality invitation from FINA to send two swimmers (one male and one female) to the Olympics.

Table tennis

Syria has received an invitation from the Tripartite Commission to send Heba Alllejji in the women's singles for the first time to the Olympic table tennis tournament.

Weightlifting

Syria has qualified one male weightlifter for the Rio Olympics by virtue of a top seven national finish at the 2016 Asian Championships. The team must allocate this place by June 20, 2016.

References

External links 
 

Olympics
Nations at the 2016 Summer Olympics
2016